Ned Steinberger (b. Princeton, New Jersey, 1948) is an American creator of innovative musical instruments. He is most notable for his design of guitars and basses without a traditional headstock, which are called Steinberger instruments. He also has a line of electric basses and string instruments through his company called NS Design and was also the designer of the first ever Spector bass, the NS. In addition, Ned and Emmett Chapman, creator of the Chapman Stick, collaborated on the creation of the NS Stick, a guitar/bass "multi-mode" instrument sold by Stick Enterprises.

Ned Steinberger began his design career creating furniture and custom cabinetry. In 1977, while working alongside luthier Stuart Spector, Ned designed his first musical instrument, the Spector NS-1 bass guitar. While attempting to source materials in an industrial area of New York City, he visited Lane Marine, a lifeboat builder, where he met with Bob Young, an engineer with deep knowledge of carbon fiber. Though Young was more than twice Steinberger’s age and had no experience with musical instruments, he joined forces with Steinberger after getting great feedback from his son, a recording engineer, who took to the instrument and understood the appeal of its construction. The Spector NS quickly became Spector’s most popular bass design and remains so to this day. Inspired by that first creation, Steinberger set out to explore the possibilities of bass design. His search led to alternate materials, like carbon fiber and the headless concept. His company, Steinberger Sound, launched in 1980, found immediate success with the L2 bass. Steinberger headless guitars and other bass models followed. After selling Steinberger to the Gibson group of musical instruments, Ned started a second company, NS Design in 1990. NS Design continues Ned Steinberger's boundary-pushing designs with a family of bowed electric instruments as well as headless guitars and basses.

Ned is the son of 1988 physics Nobel laureate Jack Steinberger (born May 25, 1921 in Germany – December 12, 2020).

References

External links
Ned Steinberger official site
Ned Steinberger page
Stick Enterprises NS Stick page
Ned Steinberger Biography by Jim Reilly

Inventors of musical instruments
1948 births
People from Princeton, New Jersey
Living people
20th-century American Jews
American people of German-Jewish descent
Engineers from New Jersey
21st-century American Jews